Carinella may refer to:
 Carinella, a genus of worms in the family Tubulanidae, synonym of Tubulanus
 Carinella, a genus of gastropods in the family Amastridae, synonym of Kauaia
 Carinella, a genus of nematodes in the family Onchocercidae, synonym of Aproctella
 Carinella, a fossil genus of bivalves in the order Hippuritida, family unassigned, synonym of Caprinella
 Carinella, a fossil genus of bryozoans in the family Goniocladiidae, synonym of Goniocladia